Blake Leo Wingle (born April 17, 1960) is a former Guard in the National Football League who played for the Pittsburgh Steelers, Green Bay Packers and the Cleveland Browns.  Wingle played collegiate ball for Cal Poly-San Luis Obispo, Ventura Junior College and UCLA before being drafted by the Pittsburgh Steelers in the 9th round of the 1983 NFL Draft.  He played professionally for 4 seasons in the NFL and retired in 1987. | He was inducted into The Ventura County Sports Hall Of Fame 2018.

Personal life
A resident of Bakersfield, California, where Blake and his wife Lisa have three kids: Brent, Emily, Brandon and Aubrey.

References

1960 births
Living people
Players of American football from California
American football offensive guards
Cal Poly Mustangs football players
UCLA Bruins football players
Pittsburgh Steelers players
Cleveland Browns players
Green Bay Packers players
Sportspeople from Oxnard, California
Sportspeople from Ventura County, California